Ian Sinclair (born 1960 in Toronto, Ontario) is a former professional Canadian football offensive lineman who played eleven seasons in the Canadian Football League for the BC Lions. He played college football at the University of Miami where he was part of the 1983 Miami Hurricanes football team national champions. He also was a part of the Lions Grey Cup victories in 1985 and 1994.

References

External links

1960 births
Living people
Players of Canadian football from British Columbia
Canadian football offensive linemen
BC Lions players
Miami Hurricanes football players
People from Coquitlam
Canadian football people from Toronto